13th Nova Scotia general election may refer to:

Nova Scotia general election, 1826, the 13th general election to take place in the Colony of Nova Scotia, for the 13th General Assembly of Nova Scotia
1916 Nova Scotia general election, the 35th overall general election for Nova Scotia, for the (due to a counting error in 1859) 36th Legislative Assembly of Nova Scotia, but considered the 13th general election for the Canadian province of Nova Scotia